T. pentaphylla may refer to:

 Tabebuia pentaphylla, a neotropical tree
 Tecoma pentaphylla, synonym of Tabebuia pentaphylla
 Trichosanthes pentaphylla, a poisonous cucumber